The Cariboo Regional District spans the Cities and Districts of Quesnel, Williams Lake, 100 Mile House, and Wells in the Central Interior of British Columbia.

Geography
The Cariboo Regional District (CRD) in the Central Interior of BC encompasses 80,252 square kilometers of land. The Cariboo and Coastal mountain ranges hug the CRD on its west and east side boundaries. The region straddles Highway 97 from 70 Mile House in the south to 5 km south of Hixon in the north. It belongs to the PDT/PST time zones.

Incorporated municipalities
 District Municipality of 100 Mile House
 City of Quesnel
 District Municipality of Wells
 City of Williams Lake

Communities
Alexandria
Australian
Kersley
Red Bluff
Rich Bar

Other communities
 Alexis Creek
 Anahim Lake
 Horsefly
 Lac La Hache
 Likely
 Lone Butte
 McLeese Lake
 Nazko
 Nimpo Lake
 Riske Creek
 Tatla Lake
 Forest Grove
150 Mile House

Features and Amenities
The Cariboo Regional District provides region-wide library services, recreational facilities, and local fire protection.

Demographics

Note: Totals greater than 100% due to multiple origin responses.

Rural Representative Elections

Electoral directors
Twelve electoral area directors and four municipal directors govern the affairs of the Cariboo Regional District.  The electoral area directors are elected by area voters, and municipal directors are appointed by their municipal council. All directors serve for a four-year term.

Electoral areas
Regional District Electoral Areas are A, B, C, D, E, F, G, H, I, J, K and L.

Electoral areas have no administrative or governmental significance; they are used only to elect rural representatives to regional district boards.

Literature
The Cariboo District and 100 Mile House are featured prominently in Al Purdy's poem "The Cariboo Horses" to examine the tradition of equinity against human civilization.

Notes

References

Community Profile: Cariboo Regional District, British Columbia; Statistics Canada

External links

 
Regional districts of British Columbia